The Misfits Club is a 2014 Spanish teen drama film directed by . It is based on the novel ¡Buenos días, princesa! by Blue Jeans (Francisco de Paula), adapted by Ramón Campos, Gema R. Neira, Cristobal Garrido and Adolfo Valor.

Cast

Production 
The film is a Bambú and Atresmedia Cine production. Mercedes Gamero, Mikel Lejarza, Ramón Campos, and Teresa Fernández Valdés took over production duties.

Release 
The film opened in Spanish theatres on 25 December 2014.

See also 
 List of Spanish films of 2014

References

External links 

2014 drama films
Spanish teen drama films
2010s teen drama films
Atresmedia Cine films
Films based on Spanish novels
2010s Spanish films
Bambú Producciones films
2010s Spanish-language films